Didaco Philetari (fl. 1645) was an Italian composer, presumably active in Germany, whose works are preserved in the Düben collection in Uppsala University Library. His Salve Rex Christe was recorded in 2009 by Anna Jobrant.

References

Italian male classical composers
Italian Baroque composers